Bobby Ciraldo (born 12 October 1974 in Skokie, Illinois) is a filmmaker and web-based artist whose works include Hamlet A.D.D., William Shatner's Gonzo Ballet, the production of Frankie Latina's Modus Operandi, Samwell's What What (In the Butt), and a music video for Leslie and the Ly's called "Zombie Killer" (featuring Elvira).  He attended Grinnell College and later collaborated with Chris Smith, Ray Chi, and Scott Reeder to create ZeroTV.com, a precursor to MySpace and YouTube.

His Milwaukee-based production company Special Entertainment is co-owned by collaborator Andrew Swant.  Ciraldo's films have won first prize at Milwaukee's 24-hour Film Festival in 2005 and 2007, and he has exhibited work at New York's White Columns gallery.  According to the Internet Movie Database, he has worked as a computer programmer and holds two patents (one in the U.S. and one in Europe). Ciraldo co-created a broadcast television show with Andrew Swant and David Robbins called Something Theater, which has been airing since early 2009.

References

External links
 
 Spoiler Alert Radio interview with Bobby Ciraldo
 OnMilwaukee Article regarding Bobby Ciraldo

1974 births
People from Skokie, Illinois
Grinnell College alumni
Living people
Filmmakers from Milwaukee
Film producers from Illinois
Film producers from Wisconsin